Charilaos "Charis" Pappas (Greek: Χαρίλαος "Χάρης" Παππάς; born 12 May 1983) is a Greek former professional footballer who played as a right winger.

Career
He began his career in Panserraikos, Greece. In January 2003, he moved to Thessaloniki and signed for Apollon Kalamarias FC. In 2003–04, Pappas' ten goals were a major factor in Kalamaria's winning promotion to the Alpha Ethniki. In his first season in the Greek top flight in 2004–05, Pappas scored six times in 26 matches. Three of these goals came in away matches, where Kalamaria earned crucial points and ultimately prevailed in their battle against relegation. That season, he scored his first goal for his country in the UEFA European U21 Championship qualifier against Albania in March 2005.

Olympiacos signed him to a five-year deal and immediately loaned him back to Kalamaria for one season. In 2005–06, Pappas scored seven times, helping his team finish ninth in the Alpha Ethniki.

Pappas joined Olympiacos in June. On 8 November 2006, he scored his first goal for the club in a Greek Cup match against Atsalenios FC. On 26 November 2006, he scored his first league goal for Olympiacos against Larissa FC. On 27 June 2007, he signed with AEK Athens.

After a mediocre season, Pappas joined fellow Super League Greece team Skoda Xanthi on 6 July 2008. On 23 June 2009, Pappas transferred to TSV 1860 Munich. On 31 July 2010, he signed with Superleague team Panetolikos. In February 2011, he returned to Panserraikos helping his team to avoid relegation. He then moved to KFC Uerdingen 05. At the beginning of 2014–15 season he signed a one-year contract with Kavala.

Honours
Olympiacos
 Greek Super League: 2006–07

Individual
 Greek Second Division best player: 2004

References

External links
 

1983 births
Living people
Greek footballers
Footballers from Kavala
Greek expatriate footballers
Association football wingers
Panserraikos F.C. players
AEK Athens F.C. players
Olympiacos F.C. players
Xanthi F.C. players
Apollon Pontou FC players
TSV 1860 Munich players
Panetolikos F.C. players
Expatriate footballers in Germany
2. Bundesliga players